Mark Lowry (born 11 August 1985) is an English football manager who is the head coach for Indy Eleven in the USL Championship.

Career
During his playing career, he represented English clubs Stafford Rangers, Halesowen Town and Hereford United. Lowry earned a UEFA B coaching licence at the age of 21, before going to on to earn an "A" licence.

He moved to U.S., coaching at Association of Christian Youth Sports Spirit United in Orlando, Florida. He later joined the staff at Orlando City SC, coaching at the academy and for the Orlando City U-23 team in the Premier Development League.

Lowry joined the coaching staff Jacksonville Armada FC in September 2015.

In August 2016, Lowry was appointed as interim coach of following Tony Meola's departure. In October 2016, he was appointed as coach on a permanent basis.

On 25 July 2018, he was announced as head coach and technical director of the expansion club El Paso Locomotive FC.

On 15 November 2021, Lowry departed from Locomotive FC. Lowry had led El Paso to the postseason each of their first three seasons, including two Western Conference Final appearances. The following day, 16 November 2021, Lowry took the managerial job at Indy Eleven.

References 

1985 births
Sportspeople from Solihull
English football managers
Expatriate soccer managers in the United States
Jacksonville Armada FC coaches
Living people
North American Soccer League coaches
National Premier Soccer League coaches
USL Championship coaches
El Paso Locomotive FC coaches
Stafford Rangers F.C. players
Halesowen Town F.C. players
Hereford United F.C. players
English footballers
USL League Two coaches
Orlando City U-23
Orlando City SC non-playing staff
English expatriate football managers
Indy Eleven coaches
Association footballers not categorized by position